Jerry Murad's Harmonicats were an American harmonica-based group.

Background
The band was founded in 1947. Originally they were named The Harmonica Madcaps and the group consisted of Jerry Murad (chromatic lead harmonica), Bob Hadamik (bass harmonica), Pete Pedersen (chromatic harmonica), and Al Fiore, (chord harmonica). In 1947, the group consisted of Murad, Fiore, Don Les on bass harmonica, and Cappy Lafell on Polyphonia. They eventually (around 1948) became a trio with Murad, Fiore, Les.

In 1947, during the record ban, the group recorded the hit song "Peg o' My Heart" for Vitacoustic Records, which spent 21 weeks on the Billboard magazine chart (peaking at #1) and sold more than 2 million copies the first year. It was the first record in history to use artificial reverb.

Pedersen and Gail Wallace remained contributors to the group throughout its existence, working on arrangements and occasionally recording.

During 1949 when Don Les' father died, the band called upon Johnny Thompson to fill in for Les on bass harmonica for a couple of weeks. Thompson went on to play with them at their residency gig at the Frontier Hotel in Las Vegas in the early 1950s. In the mid-1950s, Les suffered from a detached retina, and Thompson once again took his place until Les was able to return full time later in the decade.. In 1958, Al Fiore suffered his first heart attack and Bob Herndon filled in for him for several months.

In the early 1970s, Don Les left the group and was replaced by Dick Gardner, who stayed with the group for more than 20 years. Other members of the group included the following:

Members

Jerry Murad
Jerry Murad (1918-1996) (chromatic harmonica), was an Armenian born in Istanbul, Turkeyin 1918, moved to America at the age of 2. He played diatonic harmonicas at first, and took up chromatic soon after. Murad played Hohner 270s and 64s, as well as the Musette, a harmonica made especially for him that replicates the sound qualities of a French accordion. It is featured on their 1960s recording of "Parisienne Fantasy". Murad also played the Hohner Polyphonia (a type of orchestral melodic harmonica). He died of a heart attack in 1996

Don Les
Don Les (Dominic Leshinski) (1914–1994) (bass harmonica) was born in Lorain, Ohio, with congenital cataracts. He was able to see again at the age of twelve after a "couple of operations," but even as an adult his vision was only about 30% of normal. At one point, he formed his own version of the Harmonicats. The Don Les Harmonicats, which featured Mildred Mulcay (of the harmonica duo the Mulcays) and Lenny Leavitt. They released a Christmas album entitled Christmas with the Don Les Harmonicats.

Al Fiore
Al Fiore (chord harmonica), was born in Chicago and started experimenting with chord harmonicas at the age of 13. Fiore played the rare old style layout or "reverse layout" Hohner Chord harmonica. He recorded the band's No. 1 hit, Peg o' My Heart on this harmonica.

Cappy Laffel
Leon "Cappy" Laffel was the Polyphonia player for the Harmonicats for the 1947 and 1948 years. He left before 1950. He can be heard on songs such as "Ritual Fire Dance" and "Always in my Heart".

John Thompson
John Thompson joined The Harmonicats in 1951 on bass harmonica, but lasted a very short time due to conflicts.

Dick Gardner
Dick Gardner (bass harmonica) took over for Don Les in 1970 and remained with the Cats for over 20 years.

Bob Bauer
Bob Bauer (chord harmonica) took over for George Miklas in 1985 and after Al Fiore left the group He remained many years.

George Miklas 
George Miklas was originally a chord player for the group before leaving the group and returning later to play bass with the group.

Al Data
Al Data played chord with the group in its final days, until Jerry's death in 1996.

Joe Mass Jr.
Joe Mass Junior (1953–2018) played chord for the Harmonicats one year, while on tour in California.

J.R. Mass
Brother to Joe Mass Jr., Jerry "J.R." Mass played the bass harmonica for the Harmonicats one year, while on tour in California.

Buddy Boblink
Charles "Buddy" Boblink played chord with the group throughout the 1990s and until Jerry's death in 1996.

Pete Pedersen
Pete Pedersen was the main arranger for the group and remained the 2nd chromatic player for many albums over the bands nearly 50 years of recording.

Frank Warner
Frank Warner filled in at times playing the bass harmonica.

Peg o' My Heart
Their 1947 recording of the song "Peg o' My Heart" (Mercury Records, originally on Bill Putnam's Universal Records and then reissued on Vitacoustic Records, catalog number 1) brought them public attention and sold over one million copies by 1950, reaching No. 1 on the U.S. Billboard chart. When recording engineer Bill Putnam recorded the song, he utilized the bathroom of Universal Recording as an echo chamber and became the first person to use artificial reverberation creatively on a pop recording.

Other charted hits for the group included "Hair of Gold, Eyes of Blue" (No. 15) in 1948, "Charmaine" (No. 21) in 1952, and "Cherry Pink and Apple Blossom White" (No. 56) in 1961. Jerry Murad, accompanied by Richard Hayman's Orchestra, had a solo hit with "The Story of Three Loves" (No. 14) in 1953.

Discography

10" albums
 Jerry Murad's Harmonicats (Mercury, 1950)
 Harmonica Highlights (Mercury, 1952)
 Harmonica Hits (Mercury, 1952)
 Harmonica Classics (Mercury, 1952)
 Olé: South of the Border with the Harmonicats (Mercury, 1954)

12" albums
 Harmonicats' Selected Favorites (Mercury, 1955)
 South American Nights (Mercury, 1956)
 Command Performance (Mercury, 1956)
 The Cats Meow (Mercury, 1956)
 Dolls, Dolls, Dolls (Mercury, 1957)
 Harmonicha Cha-Cha (Mercury, 1958)
 In the Land of Hi-Fi (Mercury, 1959)
 Harmonically Yours (Mercury, 1960)
 Cherry Pink and Apple Blossom White (Columbia, 1960)
 Peg o' My Heart (Columbia, 1961)
 Love Theme from El Cid and Other Motion Picture Songs and Themes (Columbia, 1962)
 Sentimental Serenade (Columbia, 1962)
 Fiesta! (Columbia, 1962)
 Forgotten Dreams (Columbia, 1963)
 The Soul of Italy (Columbia, 1963)
 Try a Little Tenderness (Columbia, 1963)
 The Love Song of Tom Jones (Columbia, 1964)
 That New Gang of Mine! (Columbia, 1965)
 Harmonica Rhapsody (Columbia, 1965)
 What's New Harmonicats? (Columbia, 1966)
 Great Themes from TV and Motion Pictures (Columbia, 1969)

References

External links
Official website (Archived as of Feb.2011)

American instrumental musical groups
Columbia Records artists
Harmonica
Mercury Records artists
Musical groups established in 1947
Musical groups from Chicago